Francisco Sá Carneiro Airport  or simply Porto Airport (formerly Pedras Rubras Airport) is an international airport near Porto (Oporto), Portugal. The airport is currently the second-busiest in the country, based on aircraft operations; and the second-busiest in passengers, based on Aeroportos de Portugal traffic statistics, after Lisbon Airport and before Faro Airport. The airport is a base for easyJet, Ryanair, TAP Air Portugal and its subsidiary TAP Express.

Location
The airport is surrounded by the municipalities of Matosinhos (to the south and west) and Vila do Conde (to the north) and Maia (to the east). It covers the parishes of Santa Cruz do Bispo, Perafita and Lavra (in Matosinhos); Aveleda and Vilar do Pinheiro (Vila do Conde); and Vila Nova da Telha and Moreira (Maia). The southern portion of the airport intersects the hydrographic watershed of the Leça River, while the north is crossed by effluents of Onda River.

History
The airport around Porto opened in 1945 and was initially known as Pedras Rubras Airport, after the name for the locality where the airport is located: Pedras Rubras ("red rocks"). It is still known by this name in the region. The land on which the airport was built was originally agricultural, characterised by rich soils that permitted the cultivation of various cereals.

It was renamed in 1990 after former Portuguese prime minister, Francisco de Sá Carneiro, who died in a plane crash when he was traveling to this airport on 4 December 1980.

Along with the airports in Lisbon, Faro, Ponta Delgada, Santa Maria, Horta, Flores, Madeira, and Porto Santo, the airport's concessions to provide support to civil aviation were conceded to ANA Aeroportos de Portugal on 18 December 1998, under provisions of decree 404/98. With this concession, ANA became responsible for the planning, development and construction of future infrastructure.

A new terminal building, designed by Portuguese firm ICQ, was built between 2003 and 2006, and became operational in the last quarter of 2006.

Porto Airport reached ten million passenger per year for the first time on 6 December 2017.

Airlines and destinations

Passenger
The following airlines operate regular scheduled direct passenger flights at Porto Airport:

Cargo

Statistics

Ground transport
Besides taxi services and the road link, there are several public transportation links available:

Metro 

The airport is served by Line E of the Porto Metro. The station has three platforms and the trains leave the arrival platform and reverse into one of the departure platforms.

The service links the airport to Porto city center and by transfer in Trindade station to high-speed trains at Campanhã, and other urban centres of Greater Porto: in Verdes station to Vila do Conde and Póvoa de Varzim (using line B), Fonte do Cuco station to Maia (line C), Senhora da Hora station to Matosinhos (line A), and Trindade station to V.N.Gaia (line D) and to Rio Tinto/Fânzeres (line F).

Car
Sá Carneiro airport is accessible via the A41 and A28 motorways, but also the EN13 highway (using the EN107 accessway). These roadways lead to drop-off and pick-up areas and short and long-stay car parks. It can also be reached by the A4 motorway through the VRI accessway.

Bus
STCP buses also link the airport and the city. There is also a bus that operates all night from Porto city centre to the airport. Also there is a bus service to/from Vigo (Galicia/Spain) twice a day on weekdays, and once a day during the weekend.

Shuttle
The GetBUS shuttle provides 50 min direct connections to the towns of Braga and Guimarães.

Further proposals
The proposed Porto–Vigo high-speed rail line would be built via the airport.

Accolades
Airports Council International Airport Service Quality Awards voted the airport Best Airport in Europe in 2007. Additionally, it has placed in the top three of Best Airport in Europe a further nine times – winning second place in 2010, and third place in 2006, 2008, 2009, 2011, 2013, 2014, 2015, and 2016.

Accidents and incidents
On April 27, 2021 a FedEx cargo jet was cleared for takeoff while a ground vehicle was on the runway, coming within four seconds of collision before taking off over it. The Office for the Prevention and Investigation of Accidents in Civil Aviation and Rail rated the incursion a "serious incident" and initiated a safety investigation.  YouTube channel 'VASAviation' has a recorded instance of the communications between Porto's Tower and the aircraft involved, FedEx Contractor Flight 'Quality 4959'

See also
Transport in Portugal
List of airports in Portugal

References

Citations

Bibliography

External links 

 Official website
 

Airports in Portugal
Airport
Buildings and structures in Porto District
Modernist architecture in Portugal
1945 establishments in Portugal
Airports established in 1945